The 2007 Losail Superbike World Championship round was the opening round of the 2007 Superbike World Championship. It took place on the weekend of February 22–24, 2007, at the  Losail International Circuit in Qatar.

Superbike race 1 classification

Superbike race 2 classification

Supersport classification

References
 Superbike Race 1
 Superbike Race 2
 Supersport Race

Losail
Superbike World Championship